Big Brother Brasil 2 was the second season of Big Brother Brasil which premiered May 14, 2002 on Rede Globo.

The show was produced by Endemol Globo and presented by Pedro Bial. The season was officially confirmed since 2001 as part of the original contract between international Endemol and Rede Globo that provided seasons until 2008.

The grand prize was R$500.000 without tax allowances, with a R$50.000 prize offered to the runner-up and a R$30.000 prize offered to the housemate in third place. 

The winner was 32 year-old cowboy Rodrigo Leonel from Ribeirão Preto, São Paulo.

Overview
For the first time, two seasons were filmed and aired back to back in the same year and the only season to air in the South American winter. It's also the first time the final vote included two housemates.

Reunion show
The reunion was hosted by Pedro Bial and aired on July 28, 2002. All the former housemates attended.

The men had choose two women (the women would do the same with the men) to compete for a spot in the final vote for the "Big Boss Prize", which awarded R$50.000. Rita and Moisés (who won their rounds against Thaís and Fabrício with 65% and 84% of the votes respectively) competed in the final vote, with Moisés ended up beating Rita with 79% of the fans' vote.

Housemates
(ages stated at time of contest)

Future Appearances 

In 2023, Fernando Fernandes appeared as a Circo (Circus) in The Masked Singer Brasil 3, he joined Group B and sang two songs before his unmasking at the fourth episode, placing at 11th in the competition.

Voting history

Notes

References

External links
 Big Brother Brasil 2
 Terra: BBB2

2002 Brazilian television seasons
02